Brefni O'Rorke (26 June 1889 – 11 November 1946) was an Irish actor, both on the stage and in movies.

Early life
O'Rorke was born as William Francis Breffni O'Rorke at 2 Esplande Villas in Dollymount, Clontarf, Dublin on 26 June 1889, and baptised at Clontarf Parish Church on 1 August 1889. His father, Frederick O'Rorke, was a cork merchant, and his mother, Jane Caroline O'Rorke, née Morgan, was an actress. He had an older brother, Frederick, who was twelve years older than him.

Career
O'Rorke began studying acting with his mother and made his professional début in 1912 at the Gaiety Theatre, Dublin in a production of Shaw's John Bull's Other Island. While still living in Dublin, he met and married in 1916 Alice Cole, a chorus-girl turned actress, who had divorced her first husband and immigrated from South Africa with her young son. Thus O'Rorke became the stepfather of Cyril Cusack. Other theatre roles included the title role in Finn Varra Maa (1917), a musical "pantomime" (or rather, light opera) written by Thomas Henry Nally with music by Geoffrey Molyneux Palmer.

In 1939 he appeared in several broadcasts in the new fledgling BBC television broadcast, including a play by Irish playwright Teresa Deevy called The King of Spain's Daughter, and produced by Denis Johnston.

Partial filmography

 The Ghost of St. Michael's (1941) – Sergeant MacFarlane
 This Man Is Dangerous (1941) – Dr Crosbie
 Love on the Dole (1941) – Dole Officer (uncredited)
 Cottage to Let (1941) – Scottish Police Inspector (uncredited)
 Jeannie (1941) – Quarantine Officer
 The Black Sheep of Whitehall (1942) – Ministry receptionist (uncredited)
 Hatter's Castle (1942) – Foyle
 The Missing Million (1942) – Coleman
 The Next of Kin (1942) – Brigadier Blunt
 The Day Will Dawn (1942) – Political journalist
 They Flew Alone (1942) – Mac 
 Unpublished Story (1942) – Denton
 The First of the Few (1942) – Specialist
 Secret Mission (1942) – Father Jouvet
 Much Too Shy (1942) – Mr Somers
 King Arthur Was a Gentleman (1942) – Colonel Duncannon
 We'll Meet Again (1943) – Dr Drake
 Tomorrow We Live (1943) – Moreau
 The Flemish Farm (1943) – Minister
 Escape to Danger (1943) – Security Officer
 They Met in the Dark (1943) – Detective Inspector Burrows
 The Lamp Still Burns (1943) – Mr Lorrimer
 The Hundred Pound Window (1944) – Kennedy
 Tawny Pipit (1944) – Uncle Arthur
 It Happened One Sunday (1944) – Engineer
 Don't Take It to Heart (1944) – Lord Chaunduyt
 Men of Rochdale (1944) – Miles Ashworth
 Twilight Hour (1945) – Richard Melville
 They Were Sisters (1945) – Coroner
 Waltz Time (1945) – Emperor
 Perfect Strangers (1945) – Mr Hargrove
 Murder in Reverse? (1945) – Sullivan
 The Rake's Progress (1945) – Bromhead
 The Voice Within (1945) – Sergeant Sullivan
 I See a Dark Stranger (1946) – Michael O'Callaghanposthumous complete:
 The Root of All Evil (1947) – Farnish
 Green Fingers (1947) – Coroner
 The Upturned Glass (1947) – Dr Farrell
 Jassy (1947) – Fielding, footman (uncredited) (final film role)

Television
National Television started in October 1936, initially broadcast just two hours a day. The station stopped broadcasting at the start of the War, and didn't restart until 1946.

"Plays" (like everything else) could last just one hour maximum, but some were only 25 minutes long. Also, there was no recording possible, so any repeat was really a new broadcast (as in The Advantages of Paternity).

Dramas

Others

Notes

References

External links
 

1889 births
1946 deaths
20th-century Irish male actors
Irish male film actors
Male actors from Dublin (city)